Wanda Live! at Third Man Records is a live album by American singer Wanda Jackson.

The album features some of Jackson's own music as well as covers of songs originally by artists like Amy Winehouse.

Track listing
"Raunchy" (instrumental)	
"Riot in Cell Block Number 9"
"I'm Busted"
"You Know I'm No Good"
"Like a Baby"
"Right or Wrong"
"Fujiyama Mama"
"Funnel of Love"
"Blue Yodel #6"
"Let's Have a Party"
"Shakin' All Over"

Personnel
Wanda Jackson - vocals
Jack White - lead guitar
Olivia Jean - rhythm guitar
Rich Gilbert - pedal steel guitar
Dominic Davis - bass
Joe Gillis - keyboards
Joey Waronker - drums
Craig Swift - saxophone
Leif Shires - trumpet
Justin Carpenter - trombone
Ashley Monroe, Ruby Amanfu - backing vocals

References

External links
Voices of Oklahoma interview with Wanda Jackson. First person interview conducted on January 17, 2012, with Wanda Jackson.

2011 live albums
Wanda Jackson live albums
Albums produced by Jack White
Third Man Records live albums